The School of Psychology at Bangor University is one of the largest psychology departments of any university in the United Kingdom. The school forms a large part of the College of Health and Behavioural Sciences. In the latest Research Assessment Exercise, the School's Ph.D. program placed 9th overall within the UK.

The PsyPag Annual Conference of 2011 was held at Bangor University, hosted by the School.

Research centres
 Bangor Imaging Unit
 Behavioural Analysis
 Centre for Mental Health
 Centre for Research on Bilingualism
 Clinical Programme
 Dementia Services
 Miles Dyslexia Centre
 Experimental Consumer Psychology
 Food and Activity Research Unit
 Incredible Years
 Tir Na n-Og Nursery
 Wales Institute of Cognitive Neuroscience
 Wolfson Centre for Clinical and Cognitive Neuroscience
 Centre for Mindfulness Research and Practice

References

Bangor University